Youvanam is a 1974 Indian Malayalam-language film, directed by Babu Nanthankode and produced by P. Subramaniam. The film stars Madhu, Thikkurissy Sukumaran Nair, Raghavan, Vijayasree and Rani Chandra. The film had musical score by V. Dakshinamoorthy.

Cast
Madhu as Mohan
Raghavan as Ravi
Vijayasree as Mini
Rani Chandra as Sharada
Thikkurissy Sukumaran Nair
K. V. Shanthi as Lakshmi
Aranmula Ponnamma as Ravi's mother
S. P. Pillai as Kunju Nair
Paravoor Bharathan as Mathew
Radhamani as Margaret
Bahadoor as Rajan 
Anandavally as Doctor
Adoor Pankajam as Rajan's Girlfriend

Soundtrack
The music was composed by V. Dakshinamoorthy and the lyrics were written by Sreekumaran Thampi.

References

External links
 

1974 films
1970s Malayalam-language films